The Judicial Building is a governmental building in Zhongzheng District, Taipei, Taiwan. It houses several  judicial agencies of Taiwan, including 
 Judicial Yuan — the judiciary and constitutional court of the government of the Republic of China on Taiwan,
 Taiwan High Court,
 Taiwan High Prosecutors Office, and
 Disciplinary Sanction Court.

History 
Originally constructed as the High Court of the Government-General of Taiwan (Taiwan Sōtokufu Kōtō Hōin), it was a major governmental building of the Japanese era. It was the highest-level judicial institution of its day, though still subordinate to the Governor-General of Taiwan's office. It held authority over the district courts and prosecutor's offices of Taipei and Taichung. Construction began on the building in 1929 and was completed in 1934.

Architecture 
The building was designed by the Japanese architect Ide Kaoru, whose other well-known works include the Executive Yuan building and Zhongshan Hall in Taipei. Originally it had three floors, with one more added later. The building is laid out in the Chinese character for "sun" (日)· Designed along minimalist lines in an eclectic style, the building features two skylights for ventilation and ambient lights, as well as arched doors and windows.

Its light green exterior wall tiles served to enhance air defence. One of its unusual features is the roof of the central tower. Octagonal with a prominent rim and a rippled surface, it is helmet-shaped in a manner reminiscent of the bell-and drum tower of Lungshan Temple of Manka, Wanhua District. This incorporation of local Taiwanese architectural forms was an element of the Imperial Crown Style, reflecting the Japanese imperialist government's ideology of the Greater East Asia Co-Prosperity Sphere through a fusion of local design features.

References

External links 
 Judicial Building at the Bureau of Cultural Heritage website 

1934 establishments in Taiwan
Buildings and structures completed in 1934
Buildings and structures in Taipei
Former courthouses
National supreme court buildings
Imperial Crown Style architecture
National monuments of Taiwan